In enzymology, a psychosine sulfotransferase is an enzyme that catalyzes the chemical reaction:

3'-phosphoadenylyl sulfate + galactosylsphingosine  adenosine 3',5'-bisphosphate + psychosine sulfate

Thus, the two substrates of this enzyme are 3'-phosphoadenylyl sulfate and galactosylsphingosine, whereas its two products are adenosine 3',5'-bisphosphate and psychosine sulfate.

This enzyme belongs to the family of transferases, specifically the sulfotransferases, which transfer sulfur-containing groups.  The systematic name of this enzyme class is 3'-phosphoadenylyl-sulfate:galactosylsphingosine sulfotransferase. Other names in common use include PAPS:psychosine sulphotransferase, and 3'-phosphoadenosine 5'-phosphosulfate-psychosine sulphotransferase.

References

 

EC 2.8.2
Enzymes of unknown structure